is a Japanese manga series written and illustrated by Akira Amano. It has been serialized in Shueisha's Shōnen Jump+ since October 2020, with its chapters collected into nine tankōbon volumes as of January 2023. Shueisha also simultaneously publishes the series in English and Spanish for free on the Manga Plus app and website. An anime television series adaptation by Diomedéa has been announced.

Premise
The series focuses on the adventures of  an eccentric private detective, and  an unskilled police officer, as they solve crimes together.

Media

Manga
Ron Kamonohashi: Deranged Detective, written and illustrated by Akira Amano, began its bi-weekly serialization in Shueisha's online magazine Shōnen Jump+ on October 11, 2020. Shueisha has collected its chapters into individual tankōbon volumes. The first volume was released on February 4, 2021. As of January 4, 2023, nine volumes have been released.

The series has been licensed for simultaneous publication in North America as it is released in Japan, with its chapters being digitally launched in both English and Spanish by Shueisha on its Manga Plus service.

Volume list

Chapters not yet in tankōbon format
These chapters have yet to be published in a tankōbon volume.

Anime
An anime television series adaptation was announced on December 18, 2022. The series is produced by Diomedéa and directed by Shōta Ihata, with scripts written by Wataru Watari, character designs handled by Masakazu Ishikawa, and music composed by Yo Tsuji.

Reception
In June 2021, Ron Kamonohashi: Deranged Detective was nominated for the seventh Next Manga Awards in the Best Web Manga category and placed in 14th out of 50 nominees.

Notes

References

External links
 

 

Anime series based on manga
Detective anime and manga
Diomedéa
Japanese webcomics
Mystery anime and manga
Shōnen manga
Shueisha manga
Upcoming anime television series
Webcomics in print